"Revolver" is a song by American recording artist Madonna from her third greatest hits compilation, Celebration (2009). It was released on December 14, 2009, by Warner Bros. Records and marked her final single release with the label, which had been her record company since 1982. The song features American rapper Lil Wayne and was written by Madonna, Carlos Battey, Steven Battey, Dwayne Carter, Justin Franks and Brandon Kitchen. It was produced by Madonna and DJ Frank E.

The single release included remixes by David Guetta and Afrojack, which won the Grammy Award for Best Remixed Recording, Non-Classical category at the 53rd Grammy Awards. This version also appears on the deluxe version of Guetta's album One More Love (2010). The single also included mixes by Paul van Dyk, Tracy Young and included remixes of "Celebration" by Akon and Felguk. The original album version does not appear on any formats of the release and some versions are credited as "Madonna vs. David Guetta".

An electropop song, "Revolver" features Madonna singing the whole song, with a guest appearance by Wayne near the end. The lyrics talk about juxtaposing love with weaponry. Contemporary critics gave a mixed review of the song. Some praised the chorus line "My love’s a revolver" while others felt that it was underwhelming and not on par with Madonna's previous songs. The single charted in the lower regions of the official charts of Belgium, Canada, Finland and the United Kingdom while reaching number four on the Billboard Hot Dance Club Songs chart of United States. The song was performed on The MDNA Tour in 2012, where Madonna wielded a Kalashnikov rifle onstage. The use of weapons in front of the audience generated controversy after the 2012 Aurora, Colorado shooting.

Background 
In March 2009, Madonna's representative Liz Rosenberg confirmed that Madonna was planning to release a greatest hits album by fall 2009. She also added that Madonna had plans to go to the studio and record new material for the album. The next day, Madonna's manager, Guy Oseary, asked fans on his Twitter for input regarding the track listing of the greatest hits album. It was later confirmed that she wrote three new tracks for the album, with Paul Oakenfold being confirmed as producer for two of the new songs. Warner Bros. Records reported the title of the greatest hits to be Celebration through Madonna's official website. They also reported that the final song on the collection was to be "Revolver", a collaboration with Lil Wayne and whose demo version was already present in the net. It was present alongside the title track. Before the album was released on September 29, 2009, the original version of "Revolver" was released on the internet; the track had previously appeared in May as a demo recording. In December 2009, NME confirmed "Revolver" as the second single from Celebration. The song was released digitally in the United Kingdom on December 14, 2009, by Warner Bros. Records along with a digital maxi single release worldwide on December 29, 2009, featuring remixes by David Guetta and Afrojack, Paul van Dyk and Tracy Young.

Recording and composition 

"Revolver" was written by Madonna, Carlos Battey, Steven Battey, Lil Wayne, Justin Franks and Brandon Kitchen, and produced by Madonna and DJ Frank E. In an interview with Hiphopupdate.com, Frank E recalled that he had gone to the recording session two hours before his scheduled meeting with Madonna to set up and give the audio files to the recording engineer, and he said that the ensuing wait was incredibly nerve-racking for him. After Madonna arrived, they recorded her vocals and the song was finished the next day.  Reminiscing about the session, he said: "I will never forget the feeling of leaving that session after vocal producing Madonna, and thinking to myself, 'It can’t it really get any harder than this.' I've taken that mentality into every other session I've been in, and it's helped me make the session and song more of a success. Unfortunately, the mix sounded like crap and the song flopped, but hey, you win some and you lose some."

The audio mixing was done by Demacio Castellon while the Pro Tools editing was arranged by Ron Taylor from Warner Bros. Records. The chorus of the song has Madonna singing the line "My love's a revolver, my sex is a killer, do you wanna die happy?" Wayne has a verse towards the end of the song, and sings the lines with reference to ammunitions, and Auto-Tune is used in his vocals. According to Houston Chronicle, the song is electropop in its composition style. The song is set in the time signature of common time, with a moderate tempo of 120 beats per minute. As per the sheet music published at Musicnotes.com by Alfred Publishing Co., Inc., the song is composed in the key of B minor, with Madonna's voice spanning from the tonal nodes of A3 to E5. "Revolver" follows in the basic sequence of Bm–D–A–Bm–D–A as its chord progression.

Critical reception 

Shaheem Reid from MTV called the song a "sugary ditty" and said that "Guest-verse sniper Weezy F. Baby (Lil Wayne) comes in later and gives himself loads of big-ups when it comes to the women." After the original version of "Revolver" leaked onto the net, Daniel Kreps from Rolling Stone commented that "this cleaned-up version with its sirenesque synths is more befitting of the Queen of Pop." He also called it the most violent love song ever. Rob Sheffield from the same magazine said that "[Madonna's] hitmaking genius is unmatched and — with the new Eurocheese blast 'Celebration' and the Lil Wayne duet 'Revolver' — undiminished."

Joseph Brannigan Lynch from Entertainment Weekly was disappointed with the track and called it underwhelming. He added: "Anyone hoping this collaboration with Wayne would mean a new direction for [Madonna] will be disappointed. 'Revolver' is pretty standard Top 40 background listening—more of the same electro R&B she played around with on Hard Candy. [...] It’s not bad by any stretch, but it certainly won’t end up on the next greatest-hits collection she releases ten years from now." However, he praised the chorus line calling it Madonna's "unnerring knack for writing charmingly frivolous lyrics." While reviewing the album, Leah Greenblatt of Entertainment Weekly called the song "glitched-out dance-floor stomper" and called the chorus a "lyrical come-on". While ranking the singer's singles in honor of her 60th birthday, Jude Rogers from The Guardian placed "Revolver" at number 74, writing that "Madonna loves metaphors [but] there have been better ideas".

Joey Guerra of Houston Chronicle said that the track was "more filler than truly fascinating." Douglas Wolk from Pitchfork commented that the presence of "Revolver" on the Celebration compilation disc was pale compared to Madonna's previous sex-themed songs like "Justify My Love" (1990) and "Erotica" (1992). Eric Henderson from Slant Magazine called the song a clumsy collaboration. In August 2018, the same author placed it at number 78 on his ranking of the singer's singles, writing: "Forget the uncharacteristic desperate crassness of choosing the then-hot Lil Wayne as a collaborator. Also, ignore the half-heartedness of the track’s electroclash gestures. What you have left is a sex-equals-guns metaphor that, with each passing year in America, grows more and more tone deaf". Sarah Crompton from The Daily Telegraph said that "Revolver" shows off Lil Wayne's skills as a singer better than Madonna's. The One Love Club mix of the song, by David Guetta, won a Grammy in the Best Remixed Recording, Non-Classical category of the 53rd Annual Grammy Awards.

Chart performance 
The song charted on the Canadian Hot 100 for one week at position 95 on the issue dated October 17, 2009, but fell off the chart the next week. On the Billboard issue dated January 16, 2010, the song made a re-entry on the chart at a higher position of 47, and was the highest debut of the chart. It made a top-20 debut on the official chart of Finland, at position nineteen and moved to 18 after two weeks. In the United Kingdom, the song was initially positioned at number 188, but after a few weeks it jumped up to a position 130 on the UK Singles Chart. The One Love remix of "Revolver", featuring David Guetta, debuted on the Belgian Singles Chart at Flanders region at position 37. After a few weeks, the song reached number 26 on the Flanders chart and 25 on the Wallonia chart. The song debuted at number 41 on Billboards Hot Dance Club Songs chart on the issue dated January 16, 2010 as the highest debut of that week, and reached a peak of four, staying for two weeks at the same position. In Italy, the song reached number 12 on the singles chart and was certified gold by the Federation of the Italian Music Industry (FIMI) for shipment of 15,000 copies of the single. The song also charted in Ireland, at position 41. In Spain the song reached 39 on the chart, for one week only. In the Czech Republic, "Revolver" debuted at number 66, and reached a peak of number 22 after seven weeks.

Live performance and controversy 

Madonna performed "Revolver" as the second song on The MDNA Tour in 2012. She performed it while holding a Kalashnikov rifle, a common weapon among many rebels, while one of her dancers held an Israeli Uzi submachine gun. Madonna and four dancers then participated in a faux fight and pretended to shoot their weapons and fire bullets. During the performance Lil Wayne appeared on the backdrop screens to perform his verse. It was noted that during the performance Madonna resembled a gunfighter in the style of Kill Bill. During her concert in Phoenix, Madonna pointed her rifle to their fans, while in Miami, she faked murdering her masked dancers. According to Jane Stevenson from Jam!, "[Madonna] really got our attention as she and her dancers wielded guns". The wardrobe for the performance consisted of a black outfit fitted with an ample cleavage, gloves of the same color and heeled boots. After the tour was finished, the singer stated she would auction all the outfits she wore on tour to help Hurricane Sandy victims. The performance of the song at the November 19–20, 2012, shows in Miami, at the American Airlines Arena were recorded and released in Madonna's fourth live album, MDNA World Tour.

The use of fake weapons generated controversy. After the concert in Colorado, Madonna was criticised over the use of fake weapons, since the public was sensitized by the 2012 Aurora, Colorado shooting, which occurred at the premiere of The Dark Knight Rises. Peter Burns, a radio broadcaster in the region, told The Hollywood Reporter that "You could see people kinda looking at each other. I heard the word 'Colorado', you know, 'Aurora', 'shooting'. You could hear people talking about it, and it was little bit unsettling. I saw two or three people get up and grab their stuff and actually leave their seats". Ray Mark Rinaldi from Reverb website said that Madonna was "dancing with guns and shooting up bad guys during 'Revolver'. It was a bloody scene, particularly tasteless in Colorado these days, but all cartoon; if folks got upset, they were supposed to". Daniel Brokman from The Phoenix said: "Madonna took the capacity crowd into a dark place that few were expecting minutes earlier from this queen of '80s pop music". In a review of the concert, Ross Raihala from Twin Cities mentioned that there was "darkness hung over much of the first half of the show" because of the performances of "Revolver" and "Gang Bang."

Meanwhile, Madonna commented on a letter published in Billboard: "I do not condone violence or the use of guns.  Rather they are symbols of wanting to appear strong and wanting to find a way to stop feelings that I find hurtful or damaging. In my case, it's wanting to stop the lies and hypocrisy of the church, the intolerance of many narrow minded cultures and societies I have experienced throughout my life and in some cases the pain I have felt from having my heart broken."

Track listing and formats 

iTunes digital download
 "Revolver" (Madonna vs. David Guetta One Love Remix) – 2:59
 "Celebration" (Remix featuring Akon) – 3:55

European / US / Argentine CD Maxi-single / Digital download
 "Revolver" (Madonna vs. David Guetta One Love Version) [featuring Lil Wayne] – 3:16
 "Revolver" (Madonna vs. David Guetta One Love Version) – 2:59
 "Revolver" (Madonna vs. David Guetta One Love Remix) – 4:31
 "Revolver" (Paul van Dyk Remix) – 8:35
 "Revolver" (Paul van Dyk Dub) – 8:35
 "Revolver" (Tracy Young's Shoot to Kill Remix) – 9:24
 "Celebration" (Remix featuring Akon) – 3:55
 "Celebration" (Felguk Love Remix) – 6:37

European / US 12" Vinyl single
 "Revolver" (Madonna vs. David Guetta One Love Remix) – 4:31
 "Revolver" (Paul van Dyk Remix) – 8:35
 "Revolver" (Tracy Young's Shoot to Kill Remix) – 9:24
 "Revolver" (Paul van Dyk Dub) – 8:35
 "Revolver" (Madonna vs. David Guetta One Love Version) [featuring Lil Wayne] – 3:16
 "Celebration" (Remix featuring Akon) – 3:55
 "Celebration" (Felguk Love Remix) – 6:37

Credits and personnel 

Madonna – writer, vocals and record producer
Lil Wayne – writer and vocals
DJ Frank E – writer and record producer
Carlos Battey – writer
Steven Battey – writer
Brandon Kitchen – writer
Demacio Castellon – mixing

Ron Taylor – Pro Tools editing
David Guetta and Afrojack – remixers (One Love remixes)
Paul Van Dyk – remixer and additional production
Tracy Young – remixer and original production
Akon – remixer and vocals ("Celebration" feat. Akon)
Felguk – remixer and additional production

Credits adapted from the liner notes of the Celebration CD and "Revolver" Remixes Maxi-Single.

Charts

Weekly charts

Year-end charts

Certifications

Release history

References

External links 
 Madonna.com > News > Celebration – All news related to Celebration

2009 singles
Grammy Award for Best Remixed Recording, Non-Classical
Lil Wayne songs
Madonna songs
Song recordings produced by DJ Frank E
Song recordings produced by Madonna
Songs written by DJ Frank E
Songs written by Madonna
Songs written by Lil Wayne
Electropop songs
Warner Records singles
Songs written by Carlos Battey
Songs written by Steven Battey